The 1949–50 Rugby Football League season was the 55th season of rugby league football. First placed Wigan successfully defended a challenge from second placed Huddersfield in the play-off final to claim the Rugby Football League Championship. The Challenge Cup winners were Warrington who beat Widnes 19-0 in the final. Wigan won the Lancashire League, and Huddersfield won the Yorkshire League. Wigan beat Leigh 20–7 to win the Lancashire Cup, and Bradford beat Huddersfield 11–4 to win the Yorkshire Cup. Crowds peaked in 1949-50 with a record 69.8 million paying to watch rugby league matches.

Championship
This season the Rugby Football League Championship was determined by a final.

Play-offs
The top four finishing teams entered a play-off series which culminated in a final between Wigan and Huddersfield, but not before Wigan had to re-play and defeat Halifax, with whom they drew in their first play-off match. Wigan won the final, claiming their seventh Rugby Football League Championship.

Challenge Cup

Warrington beat Widnes 19-0 in the final played at Wembley in front of a crowd of 94,249. This was Warrington’s third Cup final win in nine Final appearances. In the match Albert Naughton, at centre for Warrington opposed his older brother Johnny, who was in the Widnes second row. This was the second successive Final that the losing side had failed to score. The Warrington  Gerry Helme won the Lance Todd Trophy for man-of-the-match.

Yorkshire Cup

References

External links
 1949-50 Rugby Football League season at wigan.rlfans.com
 The Challenge Cup at The Rugby Football League website

Northern Rugby Football League seasons
Northern Rugby Football League season
Northern Rugby Football League season